
The following is a list of Playboy Playmates of 1959, the 5th anniversary year of the publication.  Playboy magazine names its Playmate of the Month each month throughout the year.

January

Virginia Gordon (born October 28, 1936, in Chaplin, West Virginia) is an American model and actress. She was Playboy magazine's Playmate of the Month for the January 1959 issue. Her centerfold was photographed by Ron Vogel.

February

Eleanor Bradley (born December 13, 1938, in Waukegan, Illinois) is an American model. She was Playboy magazine's Playmate of the Month for the February 1959 issue. Her centerfold was photographed by Ron Vogel.

March

Audrey Daston (born in Boise, Idaho) is an American model. She was Playboy magazine's Playmate of the Month for the March 1959 issue. Her centerfold was photographed by Lawrence Schiller.

April

Nancy Crawford (born April 16, 1941, in Valhalla, New York) is an American model. She was Playboy magazine's Playmate of the Month for the April 1959 issue. Her centerfold was photographed by Barbara and Justin Kerr.

May

Cindy Fuller (born May 13, 1938, in Boston) is an American model. She was Playboy magazine's Playmate of the Month for its May 1959 issue.  Her centerfold was photographed by Bunny Yeager.

June

Marilyn Hanold (born June 9, 1938, in Jamaica, New York) is an American model and actress.  She was Playboy magazine's Playmate of the Month for its June 1959 issue. Her centerfold was photographed by Bruno Bernard.

July

Yvette Iola Vickers (née Vedder) (August 26, 1928 – c. 2010) was a blond-haired, blue-eyed American actress, pin-up model, and singer. In 1959 she appeared as the Playboy Playmate of the Month for the July issue. Her centerfold was photographed by Russ Meyer. She also appeared in several other men's magazines.

August

Clayre Peters is an American model.  She is best known for being Playboy magazine's Playmate of the Month for its August 1959 issue. Her centerfold was photographed by Frank Eck.

September

Marianne Gaba (born November 13, 1939, in Chicago) is an American model, actress and beauty queen.  She was Miss Illinois USA 1957 Playboy magazine's Playmate of the Month for its September 1959 issue.

October

Elaine Reynolds (born September 7, 1939, in Jersey City, New Jersey) is an American model.  She was Playboy magazine's Playmate of the Month for its October 1959 issue.  Her centerfold was photographed by Frank Eck. Her centerfold appears in the 1989 film Dead Poets Society.

November

Donna Lynn (born September 21, 1936, in Walukee, Oklahoma) is an American model. She was Playboy magazine's Playmate of the Month for its November 1959 issue. Her centerfold was photographed by Frank Bez.

December

Ellen Stratton (born June 9, 1939, in Marietta, Mississippi) is an American model.  She is Playboy magazine's Playmate of the Month for December 1959.  She also became the first "official" Playmate of the Year for 1960. Her centerfold was photographed by William Graham.

See also
 List of people in Playboy 1953–1959

References

1959-related lists
Playmates Of 1959